"Jupiter" is a song by American singer Jewel, released in June 1999 as the third single from her second album, Spirit (1998). For the single release, Jewel re-recorded the vocals, gave the song a more pop sound, and changed the title of the song to "Jupiter (Swallow the Moon)". A commercial single was issued in the United States and internationally, credited as the "radio version".

The single was a minor hit in the US, peaking at number 39 on the Billboard Adult Top 40. It performed better in Canada, reaching number 47 on the RPM Top Singles chart and number 42 on the RPM Adult Contemporary chart. The music video aired on MTV, MTV2 and VH1; MTV had an episode for the video in its "Making the Video" series.

Critical reception
Chuck Taylor of Billboard magazine called "Jupiter (Swallow the Moon)" "simply splendid" and described it as a "savvy, harmony-rippled pop/rock finger-snapper", going to write that the song "embodies all that fans have come to love about Jewel."

Music video
A music video, directed by Matthew Rolston (unlike the album release) was released in 1999. In the beginning of the video, a flash of pictures are shown. Jewel is seen surrounded by neon lamps dancing and later seen sitting in a neon-lit forest at the end of the video.

Track listings
US maxi-CD single
 "Jupiter (Swallow the Moon)" – 3:30
 "Deep Water" (live) – 3:47
 "Emily" – 3:09

Australian CD single
 "Jupiter (Swallow the Moon)" (radio remix) – 3:42
 "Deep Water" (live acoustic) – 3:46
 "Jupiter" (album version) – 4:18

Charts

Release history

References

1999 singles
1999 songs
American folk songs
Atlantic Records singles
Jewel (singer) songs
Music videos directed by Matthew Rolston
Song recordings produced by Patrick Leonard
Songs written by Jewel (singer)